In investing, value premium refers to the greater risk-adjusted return of value stocks over growth stocks.  Eugene Fama and Kenneth French first identified the premium in 1992, using a measure they called HML (high book-to-market ratio minus low book-to-market ratio) to measure equity returns based on valuation. Other experts, such as John C. Bogle, have argued that no value premium exists, claiming that Fama and French's research is period dependent.

References

Investment